JOC Group Inc., is a provider of global intelligence for trade, transportation and logistics professionals. It is founded in 2003 and is headquartered in Newark, New Jersey. Owned by IHS Inc., its brands include The Journal of Commerce, PIERS: The Port Import/Export Reporting Service, and a number of directory databases covering the international trade, railroad, and trucking markets. The JOC Group also stages about 11 conferences and exhibitions serving international trade and maritime markets.

The Journal of Commerce 
The organization runs The Journal of Commerce as a weekly news magazine, which provides news in various categories, including maritime, ports, rail and intermodal, trucking, air cargo, international logistics, government regulation and policy, economy watch, international trade news, market data, and annual review and outlook. 

It has a circulation of approximately 15,000. The Journal also has an online edition, providing content as well as advertising opportunities to its clients. The website features a webcast and white papers in addition to its news and analysis sections.

Through its brands including The Journal of Commerce, JOC Group provides import and export trade information to more than 1,600 companies, governments, and associations in more than 50 countries.

History
Electra acquired JOC Group Inc., in April 2013 from UK based events-led marketing services and communications company UBM plc. The company changed its name to JOC Group Inc., following that acquisition (previously UBM Global Trade Inc.).

IHS Inc., announced in November 2014 that it had signed a definitive agreement to acquire JOC Group Inc.

References

Business intelligence companies
Companies based in Newark, New Jersey
Mass media companies established in 2003
2003 establishments in New Mexico